Bhagana is a village in Hisar Tehsil in Hisar district, Haryana, India.

Demographics
As of 2011 India census, Bhagana (Hisar) had a population of 5198 in 1047 households. Males (2765) constitute 53.19%  of the population and females (2433) 46.8%. Bhagana has an average literacy (3079) rate of 59.23%, less than the national average of 74%: male literacy (1897) is 61.61%, and female literacy (1182) is 38.38% of total literates (3079). In Bhagana (Hisar) 13.28% of the population is under 6 years of age (596).

References

Villages in Hisar district